Waymart is a borough in Wayne County, Pennsylvania, United States. The borough's population was 1,341 at the time of the 2010 United States Census.

Geography

Waymart is located at  (41.580959, -75.406826).
Founded as a Borough in 1851.
There is a large lake (Lake Ladore) near the borough.

Demographics

As of the census of 2000, there were 1,429 people, 492 households, and 344 families residing in the borough. The population density was 516.3 people per square mile (199.2/km2). There were 515 housing units at an average density of 186.1 per square mile (71.8/km2). The racial makeup of the borough was 98.67% White, 0.49% African American, 0.28% Native American, 0.07% from other races, and 0.49% from two or more races. Hispanic or Latino of any race were 1.19% of the population.

There were 492 households, out of which 33.3% had children under the age of 18 living with them, 53.7% were married couples living together, 12.2% had a female householder with no husband present, and 29.9% were non-families. 28.0% of all households were made up of individuals, and 14.0% had someone living alone who was 65 years of age or older. The average household size was 2.56 and the average family size was 3.10.

In the borough the population was spread out, with 24.4% under the age of 18, 5.5% from 18 to 24, 24.4% from 25 to 44, 20.6% from 45 to 64, and 25.1% who were 65 years of age or older. The median age was 42 years. For every 100 females there were 78.8 males. For every 100 females age 18 and over, there were 69.5 males.

The median income for a household in the borough was $35,208, and the median income for a family was $40,417. Males had a median income of $30,395 versus $19,583 for females. The per capita income for the borough was $14,498. About 8.1% of families and 12.3% of the population were below the poverty line, including 11.0% of those under age 18 and 20.7% of those age 65 or over.

Government and infrastructure
The United States Postal Service operates the Waymart Post Office.

The Federal Bureau of Prisons United States Penitentiary, Canaan is in Canaan Township, near Waymart.

The Pennsylvania Department of Corrections runs the State Correctional Institution - Waymart in Waymart.

References

Boroughs in Wayne County, Pennsylvania
Populated places established in 1790